Calosoma davidis is a species of ground beetle in the family Carabidae. It is found in China and Nepal.

References

davidis
Beetles described in 1885